National Games may refer to:
 National Games of India
 National Games of China
 National Games of the Philippines
  POC-PSC Philippine National Games
 Palarong Pambansa, national games for student athletes
 National Games of Indonesia
 National Geographic Games
 National Paralympic Games
 National Peasants' Games
 National Red Games